Elias Melkman (24 May 1903 – 3 January 1942) was a Dutch gymnast. He competed in seven events at the 1928 Summer Olympics. He was killed in the Auschwitz concentration camp during World War II.

References

External links
 

1903 births
1942 deaths
Dutch male artistic gymnasts
Olympic gymnasts of the Netherlands
Gymnasts at the 1928 Summer Olympics
Gymnasts from Amsterdam
Dutch people who died in Auschwitz concentration camp
Dutch civilians killed in World War II